The Barbados Division Three is the fourth-tier league of football in Barbados. It is organized by the Barbados Football Association.

List of Champions

References

External links
Barbados Football Association page

Football leagues in Barbados